Stanley A. South (February 2, 1928 - March 20, 2016) was an American archaeologist who was a major proponent of the processual archaeology movement. South's major contributions to archaeology deal in helping to legitimize it as a more scientific endeavor.  Additionally, South participated in the excavation and research of a number of historic sites throughout North and South Carolina, including Town Creek Indian Mound, Charles Towne Landing (SC), Brunswick Town, North Carolina, Bethabara Historic District (the first Moravian settlement in what is now Winston-Salem, NC), the John Bartlam site at Cain Hoy (SC), and Santa Elena (near Beaufort, SC), as well as Fort Dobbs and the Fayetteville Arsenal.

Stanley South was an important pioneer of the theoretical background of Historical archaeology.

He first worked as state archaeologist in North Carolina and became 1969 professor at the South Carolina Institute of Archaeology and Anthropology / University of South Carolina.

Publications

Monographs
Indians in North Carolina (1959)
Method and Theory in Historical Archeology (1977)
Historical Archaeology in Wachovia: Excavating Eighteenth-Century Bethabara and Moravian Pottery (1999)
Archaeological Pathways to Historic Site Development (2002)
An Archaeological Evolution (2005)
Archaeology at Colonial Brunswick (2010)

Edited volumes
Research Strategies in Historical Archeology (1977)

Articles
 1955: "Evolutionary Theory in Archaeology." Southern Indian Studies 7: 10-32.
 1972: "Evolution and Horizon as Revealed in Ceramic Analysis in Historical Archaeology." Conference on Historic Site Archaeology Papers 6(2): 71–116.
 1978: "Pattern Recognition in Historical Archaeology." American Antiquity 43(2): 223-30.
 1978: "Research Strategies for Archaeological Pattern Recognition on Historic Sites." World Archaeology 10(1): 36-50.
 1979: "Historic Site Content, Structure, and Function." American Antiquity 44(2): 213-237.
 1988: "Whither Pattern?" Historical Archaeology 22(1): 25-28.

References

Further reading
Binford, Lewis R. 1972. "Evolution and Horizon as Revealed in Ceramic Analysis in Historical Archaeology--A Step Toward the Development of Archaeological Science." The Conference on Historic Site Archaeology Papers 1971 6(2): 117-126.
Joseph, J. W. 1989. "Pattern and Process in the Plantation Archaeology of the Low Country of Georgia and South Carolina." Historical Archaeology 23(1): 55-68.
Tordoff, Jeffrey P. 1979. "Some Observations on the Quantitative Relationship Between Stanley South's Artifact Patterns and 'Primary De Facto' Refuse." Historical Archaeology 13: 38-47.

External links
http://artsandsciences.sc.edu/sciaa/south-stanley

1928 births
2016 deaths
20th-century American archaeologists
21st-century American archaeologists
People from Boone, North Carolina
Appalachian State University alumni
University of North Carolina at Chapel Hill alumni
University of South Carolina faculty